The false network catfish (Corydoras sodalis) is a tropical freshwater fish belonging to the subfamily Corydoradinae of the family Callichthyidae. It originates in inland waters in South America, and is found in the Amazon River in Loreto, Peru, and Amazonas, Brazil.

The fish will grow up to 1.9 in (4.9 cm) long.  It lives in a tropical climate in water with a 6.0–8.0 pH, a water hardness of 2 – 25 dGH, and a temperature range of 72–79 °F (22–26 °C).  It feeds on worms, benthic crustaceans, insects, and plant matter.  It lays eggs in dense vegetation and adults do not guard the eggs.

See also
 List of freshwater aquarium fish species

References

External links
 Photos at Fishbase

Corydoras
Fish described in 1986